In heraldry and heraldic vexillology, a blazon is a formal description of a coat of arms, flag or similar emblem, from which the reader can reconstruct the appropriate image. The verb to blazon means to create such a description. The visual depiction of a coat of arms or flag has traditionally had considerable latitude in design, but a verbal blazon specifies the essentially distinctive elements. A coat of arms or flag is therefore primarily defined not by a picture but rather by the wording of its blazon (though in modern usage flags are often additionally and more precisely defined using geometrical specifications). Blazon is also the specialized language in which a blazon is written, and, as a verb, the act of writing such a description. Blazonry is the art, craft or practice of creating a blazon. The language employed in blazonry has its own vocabulary, grammar and syntax, which becomes essential for comprehension when blazoning a complex coat of arms.

Other armorial objects and devices – such as badges, banners, and seals – may also be described in blazon.

The noun and verb blazon (referring to a verbal description) are not to be confused with the noun emblazonment, or the verb to emblazon, both of which relate to the graphic representation of a coat of arms or heraldic device.

Etymology
The word blazon is derived from French , "shield". It is found in English by the end of the 14th century.

Formerly, heraldic authorities believed that the word was related to the German verb , "to blow (a horn)". Present-day lexicographers reject this theory as conjectural and disproved.

Grammar
Blazon is generally designed to eliminate ambiguity of interpretation, to be as concise as possible, and to avoid repetition and extraneous punctuation. English antiquarian Charles Boutell stated in 1864: 

However, John Brooke-Little, Norroy and Ulster King of Arms, wrote in 1985: "Although there are certain conventions as to how arms shall be blazoned ... many of the supposedly hard and fast rules laid down in heraldic manuals [including those by heralds] are often ignored."

A given coat of arms may be drawn in many different ways, all considered equivalent and faithful to the blazon, just as the letter "A" may be printed in many different fonts while still being the same letter. For example, the shape of the escutcheon is almost always immaterial, with very limited exceptions (e.g., the coat of arms of Nunavut, for which a round shield is specified).

The main conventions of blazon are as follows:
 Every blazon of a coat of arms begins by describing the field (background), with the first letter capitalised, followed by a comma ",". In a majority of cases this is a single tincture; e.g. Azure (blue).
 If the field is complex, the variation is described, followed by the tinctures used; e.g. Chequy gules and argent (checkered red and white).
 If the shield is divided, the division is described, followed by the tinctures of the subfields, beginning with the dexter side (shield bearer's right, but viewer's left) of the chief (upper) edge; e.g. Party per pale argent and vert (dexter half silver, sinister half green), or Quarterly argent and gules (clockwise from viewer's top left, i.e. dexter chief: white, red, white, red). In the case of a divided shield, it is common for the word "party" or "parted" to be omitted (e.g., Per pale argent and vert, a tree eradicated counterchanged).
 Some authorities prefer to capitalise the names of tinctures and charges, but this convention is far from universal. Where tinctures are not capitalised, an exception may be made for the metal Or, in order to avoid confusion with the English word "or". Where space is at a premium, tincture names may be abbreviated: e.g., ar. for argent, gu. for gules, az. for azure, sa. for sable, and purp. for purpure. 
 Following the description of the field, the principal ordinary or ordinaries and charge(s) are named, with their tincture(s); e.g., a bend or.
 The principal ordinary or charge is followed by any other charges placed on or around it. If a charge is a bird or a beast, its attitude is defined, followed by the creature's tincture, followed by anything that may be differently coloured; e.g. An eagle displayed gules armed and wings charged with trefoils or (see the coat of arms of Brandenburg below).
 Counterchanged means that a charge which straddles a line of division is given the same tinctures as the divided field, but reversed (see the arms of Behnsdorf below).
 A quartered (composite) shield is blazoned one quarter (panel) at a time, proceeding by rows from chief (top) to base, and within each row from dexter (the right side of the bearer holding the shield) to sinister; in other words, from the viewer's left to right.   
 Following the description of the shield, any additional components of the achievement – such as crown/coronet, helmet, torse, mantling, crest, motto, supporters and compartment – are described in turn, using the same terminology and syntax.
 A convention often followed historically was to name a tincture explicitly only once within a given blazon. If the same tincture was found in different places within the arms, this was addressed either by ordering all elements of like tincture together prior to the tincture name (e.g., Argent, two chevrons and a canton gules); or by naming the tincture only at its first occurrence, and referring to it at subsequent occurrences obliquely, for example by use of the phrase "of the field" (e.g., Argent, two chevrons and on a canton gules a lion passant of the field); or by reference to its numerical place in the sequence of named tinctures (e.g., Argent, two chevrons and on a canton gules a lion passant of the first: in both these examples, the lion is argent). However, these conventions are now avoided by the College of Arms in London, England, and by most other formal granting bodies, as they may introduce ambiguity to complex blazons.
 It is common to print all heraldic blazons in italic. Heraldry has its own vocabulary, word-order and punctuation, and presenting it in italics indicates to the reader the use of a quasi-foreign language.

French vocabulary and grammar
Because heraldry developed at a time when English clerks wrote in Anglo-Norman French, many terms in English heraldry are of French origin. Some of the details of the syntax of blazon also follow French practice: thus, adjectives are normally placed after nouns rather than before. 

A number of heraldic adjectives may be given in either a French or an anglicised form: for example, a cross pattée or a cross patty; a cross fitchée or a cross fitchy. In modern English blazons, the anglicised form tends to be preferred.

Where the French form is used, a problem may arise as to the appropriate adjectival ending, determined in normal French usage by gender and number.

Efforts have however been made, for example by J. E. Cussans, who suggested that all French adjectives should be expressed in the masculine singular, without regard to the gender and number of the nouns they qualify, thus a chief undé and a saltire undé.

Complexity
Full descriptions of shields range in complexity, from a single word to a convoluted series describing compound shields:
Arms of Brittany: Ermine
Azure, a Bend Or, over which the families of Scrope and Grosvenor fought a famous legal battle (see Scrope v. Grosvenor and image above).
Arms of Östergötland, Sweden: Gules, a Griffin with dragon wings tail and tongue rampant Or armed beaked langued and membered Azure between four Roses Argent.
Arms of Hungary dating from 1867, when part of Austria-Hungary:
 Quarterly I. Azure three Lions' Heads affronté Crowned Or (for Dalmatia); II. chequy Argent and Gules (for Croatia); III. Azure a River in Fess Gules bordered Argent thereon a Marten proper beneath a six-pointed star Or (for Slavonia); IV. per Fess Azure and Or over all a Bar Gules in the Chief a demi-Eagle Sable displayed addextré of the Sun-in-splendour and senestré of a Crescent Argent in the Base seven Towers three and four Gules (for Transylvania); enté en point Gules a double-headed Eagle proper on a Peninsula Vert holding a Vase pouring Water into the Sea Argent beneath a Crown proper with bands Azure (for Fiume); over all an escutcheon Barry of eight Gules and Argent impaling Gules on a Mount Vert a Crown Or issuant therefrom a double-Cross Argent (for Hungary).

Points

Inescutcheon

Divisions of the field

The field of a shield in heraldry can be divided into more than one tincture, as can the various heraldic charges. Many coats of arms consist simply of a division of the field into two contrasting tinctures. These are considered divisions of a shield, so the rule of tincture can be ignored. For example, a shield divided azure and gules would be perfectly acceptable. A line of partition may be straight or it may be varied. The variations of partition lines can be wavy, indented, embattled, engrailed, nebuly, or made into myriad other forms; see Line (heraldry).

Ordinaries

In the early days of heraldry, very simple bold rectilinear shapes were painted on shields. These could be easily recognized at a long distance and could be easily remembered. They therefore served the main purpose of heraldry: identification. As more complicated shields came into use, these bold shapes were set apart in a separate class as the "honorable ordinaries". They act as charges and are always written first in blazon. Unless otherwise specified they extend to the edges of the field. Though ordinaries are not easily defined, they are generally described as including the cross, the fess, the pale, the bend, the chevron, the saltire, and the pall.

There is a separate class of charges called sub-ordinaries which are of a geometrical shape subordinate to the ordinary. According to Friar, they are distinguished by their order in blazon. The sub-ordinaries include the inescutcheon, the orle, the tressure, the double tressure, the bordure, the chief, the canton, the label, and flaunches.

Ordinaries may appear in parallel series, in which case blazons in English give them different names such as pallets, bars, bendlets, and chevronels. French blazon makes no such distinction between these diminutives and the ordinaries when borne singly. Unless otherwise specified an ordinary is drawn with straight lines, but each may be indented, embattled, wavy, engrailed, or otherwise have their lines varied.

Charges

A charge is any object or figure placed on a heraldic shield or on any other object of an armorial composition. Any object found in nature or technology may appear as a heraldic charge in armory. Charges can be animals, objects, or geometric shapes. Apart from the ordinaries, the most frequent charges are the cross – with its hundreds of variations – and the lion and eagle. Other common animals are stags, wild boars, martlets, and fish. Dragons, bats, unicorns, griffins, and more exotic monsters appear as charges and as supporters.

Animals are found in various stereotyped positions or attitudes. Quadrupeds can often be found rampant (standing on the left hind foot). Another frequent position is passant, or walking, like the lions of the coat of arms of England. Eagles are almost always shown with their wings spread, or displayed. A pair of wings conjoined is called a vol.

In English heraldry the crescent, mullet, martlet, annulet, fleur-de-lis, and rose may be added to a shield to distinguish cadet branches of a family from the senior line. These cadency marks are usually shown smaller than normal charges, but it still does not follow that a shield containing such a charge belongs to a cadet branch. All of these charges occur frequently in basic undifferenced coats of arms.

Marshalling

To marshal two or more coats of arms is to combine them in one shield. This can be done in a number of ways, of which the simplest is impalement: dividing the field per pale and putting one whole coat in each half. Impalement replaced the earlier dimidiation combining the dexter half of one coat with the sinister half of another because dimidiation can create ambiguity. 

A more versatile method is quartering, division of the field by both vertical and horizontal lines. As the name implies, the usual number of divisions is four, but the principle has been extended to very large numbers of "quarters".

The third common mode of marshalling is with an inescutcheon, a small shield placed in front of the main shield.

Variations of the field

The field of a shield, or less often a charge or crest, is sometimes made up of a pattern of colours, or variation. A pattern of horizontal (barwise) stripes, for example, is called barry, while a pattern of vertical (palewise) stripes is called paly. A pattern of diagonal stripes may be called bendy or bendy sinister, depending on the direction of the stripes. Other variations include chevrony, gyronny and chequy. Wave shaped stripes are termed undy. For further variations, these are sometimes combined to produce patterns of barry-bendy, paly-bendy, lozengy and fusilly. Semés, or patterns of repeated charges, are also considered variations of the field. The Rule of tincture applies to all semés and variations of the field.

Differencing and cadency

Cadency is any systematic way to distinguish arms displayed by descendants of the holder of a coat of arms when those family members have not been granted arms in their own right.  Cadency is necessary in heraldic systems in which a given design may be owned by only one person at any time, generally the head of the senior line of a particular family.  As an armiger's arms may be used 'by courtesy', either by children or spouses, while they are still living, some form of differencing may be required so as not to confuse them with the original undifferenced or "plain coat" arms. Historically, arms were only heritable by males and therefore cadency marks had no relevance to daughters; in the modern era, Canadian and Irish heraldry include daughters in cadency. These differences are formed by adding to the arms small and inconspicuous marks called brisures, similar to charges but smaller. They are placed on the fess-point, or in-chief in the case of the label. Brisures are generally exempt from the rule of tincture. One of the best examples of usage from the medieval period is shown on the seven Beauchamp cadets in the stained-glass windows of St Mary's Church, Warwick.

See also
Flag terminology

Notes

References

General

 Brault, Gerard J. (1997). Early Blazon: Heraldic Terminology in the Twelfth and Thirteenth Centuries, (2nd ed.). Woodbridge, UK: The Boydell Press. .
 Elvin, Charles Norton. (1969). A Dictionary of Heraldry. London: Heraldry Today. .
 Parker, James. A Glossary of Terms Used in Heraldry, (2nd ed.). Rutland, VT: Charles E. Tuttle Co. .

 
 

 Books

External links
 
 
 Heraldic Dictionary
 A Heraldic Primer, by Stephen Gold and Timothy Shead, explaining the terminology in detail
 A Grammar of Blazonry by Bruce Miller
 "Commonly Known" Heraldic Blazon/Emblazon Knowledge, an SCA  page with a lengthy dictionary of blazon terms
 Public Register of the Canadian Heraldic Authority with many useful official versions of modern coats of arms, searchable online
 Civic Heraldry of England and Wales, fully searchable with illustrations
 Arms of members of the Heraldry Society of Scotland, fully searchable with illustrations of bearings
 Arms of members of the Heraldry Society (England), with illustrations of bearings
 Members' Roll of Arms of the Royal Heraldry Society of Canada, with illustrations of bearings
 Create a Shield from a Blazon. It tries to draw a shield from blazon text.

Heraldry
Vexillology
Technical terminology